Altınoluk, formerly Papazlık,  is a town and summer resort in the Edremit district of Balıkesir Province in western Turkey.

The ancient city Antandrus, Kazdağı National Park and Şahindere Canyon are visitor attractions around Altınoluk.

External links 
 Altınoluk Municipality website 
 Altınoluk Municipality profile at YerelNet.org.tr 
 Altınoluk Guide 
 Altınoluk Nerede 

Populated places in Balıkesir Province
Seaside resorts in Turkey
Fishing communities in Turkey
Towns in Turkey